The National Film Award for Second Best Feature Film was one of the National Film Awards presented annually by the Directorate of Film Festivals, the organisation set up by Ministry of Information and Broadcasting, India. It was one of several awards presented for feature films and awarded with Rajat Kamal (Silver Lotus).

The award was instituted in 1957, at the 5th National Film Awards. It was awarded annually to a film produced in India that year, in any Indian language. It was last awarded in 1992, at the 40th National Film Awards.

Winners 
Award includes 'Rajat Kamal' (Silver Lotus) and cash prize. Following are the award winners over the years:

References

External links 
 Official Page for Directorate of Film Festivals, India
 National Film Awards Archives

Second Best Feature Film